Sir Thomas North Dick Lauder of Fountainhall, 9th Baronet (28 April 1846 – 19 June 1919) was a Scottish aristocrat and a Knight of Justice in the Order of St. John of Jerusalem

Life 
Thomas North Dick-Lauder was born on 28 April 1846 in Grange House, Grange, Edinburgh. He was the eldest son of Sir John Dick-Lauder, 8th Baronet and Lady Anne Dalrymple, the second daughter of North Dalrymple, 9th Earl of Stair. He was baptised 12 June at St Cuthbert's, Edinburgh. On 27 September 1867 he was served heir to his father.

On 30 December 1869 he was appointed an ensign (by purchase) in the 60th Rifles, and later served for a year (14 April 1869 – 11 April 1870) as a lieutenant in the part-time Edinburgh Militia.

His principal residences were Fountainhall, Pencaitland in East Lothian, and Grange House, Edinburgh. He was a member of the Army and Navy Club, the Junior Carlton Club (both in London) and the New Club in Edinburgh.

He died unmarried on 19 June 1919 in Villa Lauder, at 16 Via St. Leonardo, Florence, Italy. He was succeeded in the baronetcy and family estates by his younger brother, Sir George Dick-Lauder, 10th Baronet.

He is buried in the Dick Lauder family plot in the Grange Cemetery in south Edinburgh. The plot lies exactly halfway along the eastern path facing the high path over the vaults.

Notes

References
 Major R.C. Dudgeon, History of the Edinburgh, or Queen's Regiment Light Infantry Militia (now) Third Battalion The Royal Scots, Edinburgh: Blackwood, 1882/Bibliolife, nd, * The Royal Families of England, Scotland, and Wales, with their Descendants, etc., by Messrs, John and John Bernard Burke, London, 1851, vol.2, pedigree CLXXIII.
 Kelly's Titled, Landed, and Official Classes Handbook, London, 1903.
 Who was Who 1916-1928, A & C Black, London.

1846 births
1919 deaths
Baronets in the Baronetage of Nova Scotia
Nobility from Edinburgh
Knights Hospitaller
King's Royal Rifle Corps officers